Poseidon Press was an imprint of Simon & Schuster publishing, operating from 1982 to 1993. The founding editor was Ann Patty, who later went on to become an executive editor at Harcourt. The imprint was best known for discovering interesting new literary voices, and launched the careers of many now-famous writers.

Poseidon Press is also the name of a fictional publishing house from the 1979 novel Proteus by Australian writer Morris West.

Books published by Poseidon Press
A Frolic of His Own, William Gaddis (1994)
Arc d'X, Steve Erickson (1993)
Bad Behavior, Mary Gaitskill (1988)
Cabal, Clive Barker (1982)
Cabal, Clive Barker (1988)
Child of the Northern Spring, Persia Woolley (1987)
Days Between Stations, Steve Erickson (1985)
Fevre Dream, George R. R. Martin (1982)
Guinevere: The Legend in Autumn, Persia Woolley (1993)
Leap Year, Steve Erickson (1989)
Little Kingdoms, Steven Millhauser (1993)
Rubicon Beach, Steve Erickson (1986)
Spider, Patrick McGrath (1990)
Stones from the River, Ursula Hegi (1994)
The Armageddon Rag, George R. R. Martin (1983)
The Blindfold, Siri Hustvedt (1992)
The Grotesque, Patrick McGrath (1989)
The Real Frank Zappa Book, Frank Zappa (1989)
Tours of the Black Clock, Steve Erickson (1989)
Two Girls Fat and Thin, Mary Gaitskill (1991)
Water Dancer, Jenifer Levin (1982)
Weaveworld, Clive Barker (1987)

References

 
1982 establishments in New York City
1993 disestablishments in New York (state)
American companies established in 1982
American speculative fiction publishers
Book publishing companies based in New York (state)
Book publishing company imprints
Defunct book publishing companies of the United States
Defunct companies based in New York City
Fantasy book publishers
Horror book publishing companies
Literary publishing companies
Publishing companies based in New York City
Publishing companies disestablished in 1993
Publishing companies established in 1982
Simon & Schuster